Colorado's 5th congressional district is a congressional district in the U.S. state of Colorado. The district lies in the center of the state and comprises Colorado Springs and its suburbs including Cimarron Hills and Fort Carson.

The district is currently represented by Republican Doug Lamborn. With a Cook Partisan Voting Index rating of R+9, it is one of the most Republican districts in Colorado.

Characteristics

Politics
The Republican Party has held control of the seat since the district's creation. With a Cook PVI of R+12, the 5th congressional district of Colorado is tied for the most conservative district in the state with the 4th district. Colorado Springs, the main population center within the district, is home to many conservative Christian organizations. Among these groups are Focus on the Family, its founder Dr. James Dobson (who is considered by some to be the most influential evangelical leader in the country), New Life Church, Compassion International, HCJB, and many others. There is some Democratic strength in this district in urban Colorado Springs and some of its suburbs near Pikes Peak, but it is no match for the overwhelming Republican tilt of the district; however, unlike the nearby 4th that is trending more Republican by the year, the 5th is becoming slightly less Republican due to demographic changes, but not enough for the area to be competitive for the near future.

Colorado Springs also boasts a large population of both active-duty and retired military personnel and is home to many companies in the defense industry, all of which are demographics that tend to vote for Republicans. Throughout the district's history, Republicans have won by comfortable margins. From 1996 through 2004, Republican Joel Hefley usually won reelections with about 70% of the vote. George W. Bush received 66% of the vote in this district in 2004.

Economy
Because of the strong military presence, Colorado Springs's economy is usually very stable and frequently sees growth. The western portions of the district are mostly small mountain towns whose economy depends on ranching, farming, mining, and tourism.

Tourism
Millions of tourists visit the Colorado Springs region every year, primarily to visit Garden of the Gods, United States Olympic Training Center, U.S. Olympic & Paralympic Museum, Pikes Peak, and the United States Air Force Academy.

Military
Colorado Springs, located within the district, is home to multiple military installations. Fort Carson, the United States Air Force Academy, Peterson Space Force Base, Schriever Space Force Base, and NORAD are also all located within the district. There are more veterans living in the Colorado Fifth than any other district in America.

History

1990s
Following the 1990 U.S. Census and associated realignment of Colorado congressional districts, the 5th Congressional district consisted of El Paso and Teller counties, as well as portions of Arapahoe, Douglas, and Fremont counties.

2000s
Following the 2000 U.S. Census and associated realignment of Colorado congressional districts, the 5th Congressional district consisted of Chaffee, El Paso, Fremont, Lake and Teller counties, as well as most of Park County.

2010s

Following the 2010 U.S. Census and associated realignment of Colorado congressional districts, the 5th Congressional district consisted of Chaffee, El Paso, Fremont, and Teller counties, as well as most of Park County.

2020s

Following the 2020 U.S. Census and associated realignment of Colorado congressional districts, the 5th Congressional district consisted of most of El Paso County, while other counties towards the west are instead redistricted into the 7th district.

Voting
Election results from presidential races

List of members representing the district

Election results

1972

1974

1976

1978

1980

1982

1984

1986

1988

1990

1992

1994

1996

Republican Primary

General

1998

2000

2002

2004

2006

Republican Primary

General

2008

Republican Primary

General

2010

2012

2014

2016

2018

2020

2022

Historical district boundaries

See also

Colorado's congressional districts
List of United States congressional districts

References

5
Arapahoe County, Colorado
Chaffee County, Colorado
Douglas County, Colorado
El Paso County, Colorado
Fremont County, Colorado
Lake County, Colorado
Park County, Colorado
Teller County, Colorado
1973 establishments in Colorado